KRYN (1230 AM) is a radio station broadcasting a Spanish religious format. Licensed to Gresham, Oregon, United States, it serves the Portland, Oregon, area. The station is currently owned by Centro Familiar Cristiano.

The station was assigned the call sign KRYN by the Federal Communications Commission on October 5, 2009.

In June 2011, Adelante Media sold KRYN and three Portland, Oregon, area sister stations to Bustos Media (through its license-holding subsidiary Bustos Media Holdings, LLC) for a combined sale price of $1,260,000. The FCC approved the transfer on August 16, 2011, and the deal was formally consummated on September 30, 2011.

Effective February 8, 2019, Bustos Media sold KRYN, two sister stations, and a translator to Centro Familiar Cristiano for $374,500.

References

External links

RYN
RYN
Gresham, Oregon
Radio stations established in 1956
1956 establishments in Oregon